Kabri may refer to:

Tel Kabri, a primarily Bronze Age archaeological site - located on the kibbutz below - notable for its palace.
Kabri, Israel, kibbutz in Israel
Al-Kabri, Palestinian village, depopulated in 1948 after the al-Kabri massacre
Kabri, Burkina Faso, village in Burkina Faso
Kabri, India, village in India